Bryophyta may refer to: 

 Mosses – Bryophyta in the strict sense; a specific group of leafy nonvascular plants, now regarded as Division Bryophyta
 Bryophytes – Bryophyta in the broad sense; a group of plants regarded as a single division by some, but further split into:
mosses (Bryophyta)
hornworts (Anthocerotophyta)
liverworts (Marchantiophyta)